Miyuki Yamada (born 15 September 2006) is a Japanese Paralympic swimmer. She represented Japan at the 2020 Summer Paralympics.

Career
Yamada represented Japan at the 2020 Summer Paralympics in the 50 metre backstroke S2 event and won silver. She also competed in the 100 metre backstroke S2 event and won a silver medal.

References

2006 births
Living people
Paralympic swimmers of Japan
Swimmers at the 2020 Summer Paralympics
Medalists at the 2020 Summer Paralympics
Paralympic silver medalists for Japan
Paralympic medalists in swimming
Japanese female backstroke swimmers
S2-classified Paralympic swimmers
21st-century Japanese women